Events from the year 1781 in Great Britain.

Incumbents
 Monarch – George III
 Prime Minister – Frederick North, Lord North (Tory)
 Parliament – 15th

Events
 1 January – Industrial Revolution: The Iron Bridge opens across the River Severn.
 3 February – Fourth Anglo-Dutch War: Capture of Sint Eustatius – British forces led by General John Vaughan and Admiral George Rodney take the Dutch Caribbean island of Sint Eustatius, with only a few shots fired. On 26 November it is retaken by Dutch-allied French forces.
 5 January – American Revolutionary War: Richmond, Virginia, is burned by British naval forces led by Benedict Arnold.
 6 January – Battle of Jersey: British troops prevent the French from occupying Jersey in the Channel Islands.
 17 January – American Revolutionary War: the American Continental Army under Daniel Morgan decisively defeats British forces at the Battle of Cowpens in South Carolina.
 January – William Pitt the Younger, later Prime Minister, enters Parliament, aged 21.
 3 February – American Revolutionary War and Fourth Anglo-Dutch War: The Dutch Caribbean island of Sint Eustatius (which has been supplying the United States) surrenders to Admiral Rodney.

 28 February – foundation of the Literary and Philosophical Society of Manchester.
 13 March – Sir William Herschel discovers the planet Uranus. Originally he calls it Georgium Sidus (George's Star) in honour of King George III.
 15 March – American Revolutionary War: American General Nathanael Greene loses the Battle of Guilford Court House to British.
 1 July – Second Anglo-Mysore War: at the Battle of Porto Novo, the British defeat the Mysore ruler Hyder Ali.
 6 July – American Revolutionary War: At the Battle of Green Spring, the British led by Lord Cornwallis defeat the French led by the Marquis de Lafayette.
 27 July – French spy François Henri de la Motte executed at Tyburn (London) for high treason.
 30 August – American Revolutionary War: French fleet under the Comte de Grasse enters Chesapeake Bay, cutting British General Charles Cornwallis off from escape by sea.
 5 September – American Revolutionary War: in the Battle of the Chesapeake, a British fleet under Thomas Graves arrives and fights de Grasse, but is unable to break through to relieve the Siege of Yorktown.
 6 September – American Revolutionary War: Battle of Groton Heights – a British force under Benedict Arnold attacks a fort in Groton, Connecticut, achieving a strategic victory.
 19 October – American Revolutionary War: following the Siege of Yorktown, General Charles Cornwallis surrenders to General George Washington at Yorktown, Virginia, ending the armed struggle of the American Revolutionary War.
 29 November 
 Zong massacre: English slave traders begin to throw approximately 142 slaves taken on in Accra overboard alive from the slave ship Zong in the Caribbean Sea to conserve supplies for the remainder; the Liverpool owners subsequently attempt to reclaim part of their value from insurers.
 Henry Hurle officially founds the Ancient Order of Druids in London.
 3 December – first known building society established, in Birmingham.
 Last year in which the monarch participates in a regular peacetime meeting of the Cabinet.

Publications
 Peter Beckford's Thoughts on Hunting.
 Edward Gibbon's The History of the Decline and Fall of the Roman Empire, volumes 2 and 3.
 John Wood, the Younger's pattern book A Series of Plans for Cottages or Habitations of the Labourer.
 The collection of children's poetry Mother Goose's Melody.

Births
 21 February – Bulkeley Bandinel, scholar-librarian (died 1861)
 29 May – John Walker, inventor (died 1859) 
 9 June – George Stephenson, locomotive engineer (died 1848)
 6 July – Stamford Raffles, founder of Singapore (died 1826)
 8 July – Tom Cribb, bare-knuckle boxer (died 1848)
 14 September – James Walker, Scottish civil engineer (died 1862)
 3 November – Sarah Elizabeth Utterson, translator and author (died 1851)
 6 November – Lucy Aikin, English writer (died 1864)
 30 November – Alexander Berry, adventurer and Australian pioneer (died 1873) 
 11 December – Sir David Brewster, physicist (died 1868)

Deaths
 12 January – Richard Challoner, Catholic prelate (born 1691)
 21 February – Matchem, racehorse (born 1748)
 24 February – Edward Capell, critic (born 1713)
 19 April – Elizabeth Raffald, cookery writer and entrepreneur (born 1733)
 23 April – James Abercrombie, general (born 1706)
 8 May – Richard Jago, poet (born 1715)
 17 May – William Aislabie, politician (born 1700)
 28 September – William Henry Nassau de Zuylestein, 4th Earl of Rochford, diplomat and statesman (born 1717)
 16 October – Edward Hawke, 1st Baron Hawke, naval officer (born 1705)

References

 
Years in Great Britain